Corcione is an Italian surname. Notable people with the surname include:

Domenico Corcione (1929–2020), Italian general
Nicolas Corcione (born 1969), president of the Grupo Corcione Foundation

See also
Carcione

Italian-language surnames